Mjölnir (commonly written without diacritics as Mjolnir) and Stormbreaker, in the Marvel Cinematic Universe (MCU), are sentient enchanted weapons of choice used by Thor, the Norse god of Thunder. Both are melee weapons and were created out of Uru metal forged with the heat of a dying star in the Dwarven kingdom of Nidavellir, with the assistance of the dwarf king and master weapon-maker Eitri. Mjolnir is a hammer, and was enchanted by Thor's father, Odin, so that only those the hammer deemed "worthy" are capable of wielding or even lifting it. Stormbreaker is an axe, and although it does not have such a worthiness enchantment, its power is such that a mere mortal attempting to wield it would be driven mad.

Mjolnir first appeared in the post-credits scene in Iron Man 2 (2010), and has appeared thereafter in every film featuring Thor except for one, those being Thor (2011), The Avengers (2012), Thor: The Dark World (2013), Avengers: Age of Ultron (2015), Doctor Strange (2016), Thor: Ragnarok (2017), Avengers: Infinity War (2018), Avengers: Endgame (2019), and Thor: Love and Thunder (2022). Stormbreaker first appears in Avengers: Infinity War (2018)—also the only MCU film in which Thor does not wield Mjolnir at all—and appears again in Avengers: Endgame, and Thor: Love and Thunder. Conversely, the post-credit scene in Iron Man 2 and a scene from the second episode of the Disney+ TV series What If...? are the only MCU media in which Mjolnir appears while Thor does not.

Conceptual history

Mjolnir debuted in print in the Marvel Comics title Journey into Mystery #83 (Aug. 1962), being the means by which physician Donald Blake transformed into thunder god Thor Odinson (by striking it on the ground). The first use of the hammer's name was in the "Tales of Asgard" feature in Thor #135 (Dec. 1966) in a story by Stan Lee and Jack Kirby. The weapon's origin is eventually revealed in Thor Annual #11 (1983), with another version presented in Thor vol. 2, #80 (Aug. 2004).

Mjolnir's origin in the Marvel Comics continuity mirrors the original Norse legend. The hammer is created when Odin's adopted son Loki cuts off the hair of the goddess Sif as part of a cruel jest, and, when threatened with violence by Thor, promises to fetch replacement hair from the dwarf smiths. Loki commissions the hair from the Sons of Ivaldi, and the obliging dwarves create the hair and other gifts for the gods. Loki is convinced that no one can match their workmanship, and challenges a dwarf named Eitri to make finer treasures. After creating some other magical items, Eitri begins work on a hammer. Loki panics, fearing that he will lose the wager, and transforms himself into a moth to bother Eitri (in the original myth, Loki becomes a gadfly and stings Eitri's assistant). As a result, the hammer's handle is shorter in length than Eitri intended, meaning that it could only be wielded one-handed. Despite the error, the Norse gods consider Eitri to have forged the greater treasures, and Loki loses the bet.

In a 2002 documentary with Kevin Smith, Lee says his brother and co-creator Larry Lieber originally referred to Mjolnir as the "Uru Hammer". Writer Roy Thomas eventually changed the name of the hammer to the mythologically correct name of "Mjolnir" but maintained the Larry Lieber concept of it being composed of fictional metal "uru".

Film design
Visual Development Supervisor Charlie Wen was tasked with designing Thor's appearance for the films, and focused on mixing elements from the comic books with Norse mythology, "trying to maintain the Norse side of things" as much as possible. The first design element that Wen attempted was Mjolnir, for which Wen created a number of possible alternatives, incorporating designs including "the traditional Thor hammer with the short handle as well as the Ultimates versions", from which the one director Kenneth Branagh chose "was the most traditional one". In a 2018 interview with Jimmy Kimmel, Thor actor Chris Hemsworth revealed that he has kept a number of the prop hammers created for the film.

The concept artist tasked with designing the MCU version of Stormbreaker, Ryan Meinerding, decided to deviate substantially from the design of Stormbreaker used in the comics, feeling that "the original Stormbreaker looked a bit too much like the original Mjolnir". Consequently, Stormbreaker "more closely resembles the Mjolnir from the Ultimate Marvel run than the original Stormbreaker hammer bestowed upon Thor's rival turned ally Beta Ray Bill". Meinerding intentionally made Stormbreaker comparatively oversized and overpowered, to convey that the wielder of the weapon must also be someone incredibly powerful.

Powers and characteristics
Both weapons can be summoned by Thor, and will return to his hand after being thrown. Both weapons also enable Thor to fly, and to channel his power to summon lightning. Stormbreaker has the additional power to summon the Bifröst, allowing Thor to teleport anywhere in the Nine Realms. Screen Rant has identified Stormbreaker as the more powerful of the two, based on this ability, as well as it being a much larger and edged weapon. Both weapons also appear to have a degree of sentience, with Stormbreaker apparently being envious of Thor's affection for Mjolnir, a characteristic director Taika Waititi attributed to the handle being made from the arm of the adolescent Groot, and carrying over some of that character's moodiness at that age.

Promotion and merchandise
Mjolnir also appears in a June 2014 poster advertising the upcoming film, Ant-Man, with the protagonist in his miniaturized form standing on the hammer, though it does not appear in the film itself.

Fictional history

Origins and enchantment of Mjolnir 

In the MCU, Mjolnir initially belonged to Thor's sister Hela, who used it in battle alongside her own weaponry to subjugate the Nine Realms alongside Odin. However, Odin banished her to Hel once his expansionist desires faded. Over one thousand years later, in Thor (2011), Mjolnir is seen in Odin's vault alongside other artifacts, and it is wielded by Thor against Frost Giants on Jotunheim. Thor re-ignites a war between the Frost Giants and Asgard, and Odin banishes him to Earth, stripped of superhuman abilities. Odin then enchants Mjolnir so that only those deemed worthy may lift it, and sends it to Earth. During a post-credits scene in Iron Man 2 (2010), S.H.I.E.L.D. agent Phil Coulson reports that it was found at the center of an impact crater in a New Mexican desert. Locals attempt to move it with various methods, including the pull of a pickup truck, though none are successful. Thor depicts Thor as being initially unable to lift the hammer as well, though he proves his worthiness by sacrificing himself against the Destroyer. Mjolnir heals Thor's injuries, and he uses it to battle his brother Loki, ultimately using it to destroy the Bifröst Bridge.

Thor uses Mjolnir in combat throughout The Avengers (2012). He wields it to battle against Tony Stark, Steve Rogers, Hulk, Loki, and Chitauri soldiers. During the Battle of New York, he uses it to bottleneck the portal above New York City, and uses the Chrysler Building to amplify the hammer's lightning in order to destroy Chitauri reinforcements and their Leviathans. In Thor: The Dark World (2013), Thor utilizes Mjolnir to battle Dark Elf king Malekith and his minions. Mjolnir sees continued use in Avengers: Age of Ultron (2015), where Thor uses it in tandem with Rogers' shield to defeat Hydra soldiers. Thor challenges other Avengers to lift the hammer at a party, and all fail except Rogers, who manages to slightly move it, surprising Thor. Stark and Banner create the Vision to counter Ultron, and while the Avengers are initially mistrustful of Vision, his ability to lift Mjolnir allows him to gain Thor's trust, and he later uses the hammer in battle. However, Stark and Rogers jest that Vision being an artificial intelligence prevents him from being truly 'worthy' of wielding Mjolnir.

Destruction of Mjolnir and forging of Stormbreaker 

In Thor: Ragnarok (2017), Mjolnir is used by Thor to defeat Surtur and his minions. Upon the death of Odin, Hela escapes from her prison, and thwarts Thor's attempt to use Mjolnir against her by destroying it. In a vision, Odin tells Thor that Mjolnir was a means to harness his power rather than the source of it, and in Avengers: Infinity War (2018), Thor travels to Nidavellir with Guardians of the Galaxy members Rocket and Groot to request dwarf king Eitri forge a replacement for Mjolnir. Eitri reveals a plan to create Stormbreaker, an axe with powers similar to Mjolnir and the ability to summon the Bifröst. After Thor is nearly killed by helping Eitri restart the damaged forge to create the weapon, Groot completes Stormbreaker by using his own arm to bind the pieces together and create a handle. Thor uses it to defeat the Outriders in Wakanda, and to attack Thanos, overpowering a counterattack by his Infinity Gauntlet—which contains all six Infinity Stones—and wounding him with a blow to the chest. Nevertheless, Thanos is able to initiate the Blip, killing half of all life, and then escapes.

Recovery of alternate Mjolnir and use alongside Stormbreaker 

Some weeks after the Blip, in Avengers: Endgame (2019), Thor uses Stormbreaker to decapitate Thanos in the Garden, though as the Infinity Stones had been destroyed, the Blip cannot be undone. Five years later, Thor has become severely depressed. After Stark invents time travel, Thor participates in the Time Heist, travelling to an alternate Asgard from the time of Thor: The Dark World to retrieve the Reality Stone in hopes of reversing the Blip. While in the alternate Asgard, he summons the timeline's Mjolnir, proving his continued worthiness. He brings Mjolnir to the present and uses it alongside Stormbreaker against an alternate Thanos. Thor uses the weapons' lightning to supercharge Stark's Iron Man armor to assist him in the fight. Thanos gains hold of Stormbreaker and uses it to nearly kill Thor, though Rogers proves worthy to wield Mjolnir, and uses it so save Thor, and is able to conjure lightning in tandem with his shield. Rogers uses Mjolnir and Thor uses Stormbreaker in the final battle against Thanos, the Children of Thanos, and his army. After Thanos is defeated, Rogers returns Mjolnir to the alternate timeline.

Restoration of Mjolnir 

In January 2022, it was reported that promotional artwork for the forthcoming fourth Thor movie, Thor: Love and Thunder, showed that the destroyed version of Mjolnir had been remade (albeit with visible cracks), and was now being wielded by a worthy Jane Foster. In the film, a flashback reveals that years earlier, Thor unknowingly enchanted Mjolnir to protect Foster. When Foster is diagnosed with terminal cancer, she researches the possibility that Mjolnir gives its wielder enhanced strength and stamina. She travels to New Asgard in search of the remnants of Mjolnir, which reassembles itself in Jane's presence and proclaims her worthy, surprising Thor when he meets her again as the new wielder of the hammer. Foster, thereby having the power of Thor, uses the alias of Mighty Thor and wields the reconstructed version of the hammer in battle against Gorr the God Butcher and his forces, and against soldiers of Zeus while visiting Omnipotence City. The reconstructed hammer, when launched from its wielder, can separate into its fragments to hit multiple targets at once before reassembling. In one comedic moment, Thor tries to summon Mjolnir, but Stormbreaker enters the room, with Thor reacting as if Stormbreaker were jealous.

Thor, Foster, and Valkyrie pursue Gorr to the Shadow Realm, where Foster sees ancient drawings that depict Thor's battle-axe Stormbreaker as a way to summon the Bifrost to enter the realm of a godlike celestial called Eternity, who can grant Gorr's wish to destroy all gods. Foster deduces the trap laid out by Gorr and throws away Stormbreaker to prevent Gorr from accessing it, but Gorr overpowers the group and threatens to kill Foster, forcing Thor to summon Stormbreaker back. Gorr successfully steals Stormbreaker and injures Valkyrie before a weakened Foster collapses. Foster learns that use of Mjolnir is actually exacerbating her cancer by draining her life force. In the final confrontation with Gorr, she nevertheless uses Mjolnir to destroy the Necrosword, at the cost of her own life. Gorr succeeds in using Stormbreaker to reach Eternity, but Thor persuades Gorr to use his wish to revive his lost daughter, Love. Thor once again takes possession of Mjolnir following Foster's death. In the end, Thor adopts Love, who has been restored from death by Eternity, and Thor gives Love Stormbreaker while reclaiming use of the restored Mjölnir and wielding it for himself.

Alternate versions
A broken, alternate version of Mjolnir owned by Throg appears in the fifth episode of Loki in the Void. In the same episode, the Loki variant described as Boastful Loki "wields a hammer that looks an awful lot Mjolnir".

Another alternate version of Mjolnir appears in the second episode of What If...? as part of the Collector's collection on Knowhere. In the third episode, the hammer appears in the desert as it had in the film, Thor, but Thor is fatally wounded by an arrow from Clint Barton while trying to retrieve it. Still another version appears in the seventh episode, which Thor uses to fight against Captain Marvel. For unexplained reasons, Thor remains the only one able to lift the hammer in this universe despite Odin never being shown enchanting it with the "worthy" spell. Thor later uses the hammer to battle a multiverse-threatening version of Ultron.

The MCU TV series Hawkeye features a fictional in-universe performance of Rogers: The Musical, a Broadway musical featuring an actor playing Thor wielding a prop Mjolnir.

References

Thor (film series)
Marvel Cinematic Universe features
Marvel Comics weapons
Sentient objects in fiction
Fictional elements introduced in 2010